Race is the third studio album released by Australian new wave band, Pseudo Echo. It was released via EMI Australia in 1988 and RCA Records internationally in 1989. Race resulted in a musical change for the group as it mirrored the music landscape at the time; dominated by big hair, big guitars and rock. While the album no doubt alienated the majority of the band's fan base, it equally attracted a new breed of rock loving fans.

The album included their track "Take On the World" which won at 1987 World Popular Song Festival (aka Yamaha Music Festival) in Japan.

Three singles were released from the album, the first "Fooled Again" (which had "Take On the World" as a B-side) peaked at No. 32 in Australia in late 1988.

Reviews
AllMusic gave the album 3 out of 5 stars.

The Doctor of alltime records gave the album 2 & 1/2 out of 7 stars, saying: "Pseudo Echo’s third album came when their fame was fading and facing this reality, they attempted to change their image and style, becoming a hard rock band. What resulted was Race, an album that was a flop both commercially and critically. With the constant sound of crunching and whining guitars, this is a record of corny, pretentious songs."

Track listings
 CD

Weekly charts

Personnel
Brian Canham – lead vocals and backing vocals, electric guitars
Pierre Gigliotti – bass and backing vocals
James Leigh – synthesizers, sampler, electric piano and backing vocals
Vince Leigh – drums and backing vocals

References

1988 albums
Pseudo Echo albums
albums produced by Julian Mendelsohn
EMI Records albums
RCA Records albums